Abraham Johnson   was a professional baseball player.  He was a pitcher for the Chicago Colts of the National League. He played in one game for the Colts on July 16, 1893.

References

Major League Baseball pitchers
Chicago Colts players
Baseball players from Chicago
19th-century baseball players
Date of birth missing
Date of death missing